Reginald Darnell Hunter (born March 26, 1969) is an American stand-up comedian based in the United Kingdom.

Early life and family
Hunter was born in Albany, Georgia, the youngest of nine. He undertook an acting internship in Jackson, Mississippi, at age 20. His mother died in 2004.

Whilst appearing as a guest on Richard Herring's Leicester Square Theatre Podcast in 2018, Hunter revealed that he has a daughter, then aged 16, whom he had met for the first time in 2016.

Stand-up comedy

Having initially travelled to the UK at the age of 27 as a summer student at the Royal Academy of Dramatic Art, Hunter became a comedian after performing his first comedy set as a dare, for which he received £100. Realising that he enjoyed performing comedy, and that it might be profitable, he turned his attention from acting to stand-up.

In 2006 and 2008, Hunter participated in Project X Presents events. In 2013 he toured Ireland with his show In the Midst of Crackers.

Hunter often uses variations of the term "nigga" in the titles of his shows. Reginald D Hunter: Pride & Prejudice... & Niggas attracted some controversy, and the poster was banned from the London Underground. His tour with Steve Hughes, called Trophy Nigga, played 55 venues around the UK, but not all the venues used the tour title. Hunter joked that this was because promoters didn't like the word "trophy".

In April 2013, Hunter performed at an engagement for the Professional Footballers' Association. Following the event, PFA chairman Clarke Carlisle accused Hunter of racism, as he had used the word "nigger" during his set. Carlisle also said that some of those present had found Hunter's material "highly offensive". In response, Hunter posted to his Facebook page many photos of himself taken after his set with people attending the event, with most smiling.

Awards
Hunter was nominated for the Perrier Award in the 2003 and 2004 Edinburgh Festivals.

He won the Writers' Guild Award for Comedy in 2006 for his show Pride & Prejudice... & Niggas.

Television
Hunter made his TV debut on Channel 4's The 11 O'Clock Show in 1998.

TV subsequent credits include:

2004
 Does Doug Know (Channel 4)
 Boozy Britain (Channel 4)
 Comedy Store Stand-up (Channel 5)
 8 Out of 10 Cats (Channel 4)
 Never Mind the Buzzcocks (BBC Two)
 Have I Got News for You (BBC One)

2007
 News Knight (ITV1)
 8 Out of 10 Cats (Channel 4)
 Have I Got News for You (BBC One)

2008
 Good News Week (TEN) AUS
 Have I Got News for You (BBC One)
 Spicks and Specks (ABC1) AUS
 Trexx and Flipside (BBC Three)
 Lawro and the Warlocks of Doom (6 Music)

2009
 QI (BBC Four / One / Two)
 Good News Week (TEN) AUS
 Argumental (Dave)
 Have I Got News for You (BBC One)
 8 Out of 10 Cats (Channel 4)
 You Have Been Watching (Channel 4)
 Spicks and Specks (ABC1) AUS
 Would I Lie to You? (BBC One)
 It's Only a Theory (BBC Four)
 Live at the Apollo (BBC One)

2010
 The Bubble (BBC Two)
 Spicks and Specks (ABC1) AUS
 Friday Night with Jonathan Ross (BBC One)
 You Have Been Watching (Channel 4)
 Have I Got News for You (BBC One)
 The Green Room with Paul Provenza (Showtime)

2011
 Stand and Deliver (RTÉ 2) IRL
 Have I Got News for You (BBC One)
 This Week (BBC One - UK politics show)
 Something for the Weekend (BBC)
 The Hour (STV)
 Dave's One Night Stand (Dave)

2012
 The Graham Norton Show (BBC)
 Have I Got News for You (BBC)
 Channel 4's Comedy Gala (Channel 4)
 8 Out of 10 Cats (Channel 4)
 QI (BBC)

2013
 Have I Got News for You (BBC One)
 Was It Something I Said? (Channel 4)

2014
 Have I Got News for You (BBC One)
 QI (BBC Four / One / Two)

2015
 Reginald D Hunter's Songs of the South (BBC)
 8 Out of 10 Cats Does Countdown (Channel 4)

2016
 Acting role in Man Down - 1 episode

2018
 Reginald D Hunter's Songs of the Border (BBC Two)
 Have I Got News for You (BBC One)

Radio
Hunter is one of the hosts of the E4 Laughs at Edinburgh podcast, showcasing the best comedy talent from the 2008 Edinburgh Festival Fringe. He has had numerous appearances on the BBC Radio 4 comedy show The Unbelievable Truth. He also appeared on Midweek (BBC Radio 4) on November 15, 2011.

Stand-up DVDs
Live (November 14, 2011)
Live: In the Midst of Crackers (November 18, 2013)

Stand-up tours
 A Mystery Wrapped in a Nigga
 Pride and Prejudice... and Niggas
 Sometimes even the Devil Tells The Truth
 Trophy Nigga
 In the Midst of Crackers
 Some People vs Reginald D. Hunter (2017/18)
 Bombe Shuffleur (2022)

Notes

External links
 
 "'Why should I be censored?'" London Evening Standard, December 1, 2006. Retrieved February 4, 2012
 Helen Lewis, "Reginald D Hunter: 'Old and middle-class people, if you scare them, they vote'", New Statesman, June 23, 2011, Retrieved March 3, 2012
 E4 Laughs at Edinburgh

1969 births
Living people
20th-century American comedians
21st-century American comedians
20th-century American male actors
21st-century American male actors
African-American male comedians
American male comedians
African-American stand-up comedians
African-American male actors
African-American television personalities
Alumni of RADA
American expatriates in the United Kingdom
American expatriate male actors in the United Kingdom
American male television actors
American social commentators
American stand-up comedians
People from Albany, Georgia
20th-century African-American people
21st-century African-American people